Chapleau Water Airport  was located on the Chapleau River, Ontario, Canada. It was classified as an airport by Nav Canada and was subject to regular inspections by Transport Canada.

See also
 Chapleau Airport

References

Defunct seaplane bases in Ontario
Transport in Sudbury District